The Constantijn Huygens Prize (Dutch: Constantijn Huygens-prijs) is a Dutch literary award.

History
Since 1947, it has been awarded each year for an author's complete works by the Jan Campert Foundation (Dutch: Jan Campert-Stichting), a foundation named in honor of the Dutch writer Jan Campert who died while helping Jews during World War II. The award is named after Constantijn Huygens, a 17th-century Dutch poet, diplomat, scholar and composer.

 it comes with a monetary award of €12,000.

There was no prize awarded in 1968. In 1982, Jan Wolkers refused to accept the award.

List of laureates

 1947 – P.N. van Eyck
 1948 – Adriaan Roland Holst
 1949 – J.C. Bloem
 1950 – Geerten Gossaert
 1951 – Willem Elsschot
 1952 – Pierre H. Dubois
 1953 – Martinus Nijhoff (posthumously awarded)
 1954 – Jan Engelman
 1955 – Simon Vestdijk
 1956 – Pierre Kemp
 1957 – Ferdinand Bordewijk
 1958 – Victor E. van Vriesland
 1959 – Gerrit Achterberg
 1960 – Anton van Duinkerken
 1961 – Simon Carmiggelt
 1962 – Hendrik de Vries
 1963 – Jan van Nijlen
 1964 – Abel Herzberg
 1965 – Lucebert
 1966 – Louis Paul Boon
 1967 – Jan Greshoff
 1968 – not awarded
 1969 – Maurice Gilliams
 1970 – Annie Romein-Verschoor
 1971 – F.C. Terborgh
 1972 – Han G. Hoekstra
 1973 – Beb Vuyk
 1974 – M. Vasalis
 1975 – Albert Alberts
 1976 – Jan G. Elburg
 1977 – Harry Mulisch
 1978 – Elisabeth Eybers
 1979 – Hugo Claus
 1980 – Alfred Kossmann
 1981 – Hella S. Haasse
 1982 – Jan Wolkers (declined)
 1983 – Rob Nieuwenhuys
 1984 – J. Bernlef
 1985 – Pierre H. Dubois
 1986 – Gerrit Krol
 1987 – Annie M.G. Schmidt
 1988 – Jacques Hamelink
 1989 – Anton Koolhaas
 1990 – Hans Faverey
 1991 – Bert Schierbeek
 1992 – Cees Nooteboom
 1993 – Jeroen Brouwers
 1994 – Judith Herzberg
 1995 – F. Springer
 1996 – H.C. ten Berge
 1997 – Leonard Nolens
 1998 – H.H. ter Balkt
 1999 – Willem Jan Otten
 2000 – Charlotte Mutsaers
 2001 – Louis Ferron
 2002 – Kees Ouwens
 2003 – Sybren Polet
 2004 – Willem G. van Maanen
 2005 – Marga Minco
 2006 – Jacq Firmin Vogelaar
 2007 – Toon Tellegen
 2008 – Anneke Brassinga
 2009 – Arnon Grunberg
 2010 – A.L. Snijders
 2011 - A. F. Th. van der Heijden
 2012 - Joke van Leeuwen
 2013 - Tom Lanoye
 2014 - Mensje van Keulen
 2015 - Adriaan van Dis
 2016 - Atte Jongstra
 2017 - Hans Tentije
 2018 - Nelleke Noordervliet
 2019 - Stefan Hertmans
 2020 - Guus Kuijer
 2021 - Peter Verhelst
 2022 - Marion Bloem

References

External links

Constantijn Huygens-prijs, official website 

Awards established in 1947
Dutch literary awards
Literary awards honoring writers
1947 establishments in the Netherlands